The Automobile Society India started in 2011. ASI started conducting Technician Membership and Senior membership exams through its Institution of Automobile Engineers India. In 2014, the society established a State Private Technical University in Arunachal Pradesh, the North East Frontier Technical University.

Membership Examination
The Automobile Society conducts Technician Membership Examination and Senior Technician membership Examination twice in a year.

Skill Development Programmes
Automobile Society india is a training partner of NSDC Star Scheme. Society already trained more than 4000 students under this scheme. Now society also plan to implement more Skill Development programmes through its Students chapters and University.

Memberships
 Life Member - The Engineering Council Of India
 Member - Assocham

References 

 http://www.financialexpress.com/industry/automobile-society-to-give-skill-development-push-to-auto-sector/667557/

Road transport in India
2011 establishments in India
Automobile associations